Wall Street is a street which runs through the Financial District of New York City.

Wall Street may also refer to: 
 Financial District, Manhattan, area of New York City containing Wall Street, and is sometimes known as "Wall Street"
 Stock market, the phrase “Wall Street”, frequently used in media context as being synonymous with the public equities market
 Wall Street station (IRT Broadway–Seventh Avenue Line), at William Street, serving the  trains
 Wall Street station (IRT Lexington Avenue Line), at Broadway, serving the  trains
 Wall Street, a former train of the Reading Railroad
 Wall Street (Asheville, North Carolina), a woonerf (or living street)

In arts and entertainment:
 Wall Street (photograph), by Paul Strand
 Wall Street (1929 film), directed by Roy William Neill
 Wall Street (1987 film), directed by Oliver Stone
 Wall Street (soundtrack), a soundtrack album from the 1987 film
Wall Street: Money Never Sleeps, a 2010 film directed by Oliver Stone, sequel to the 1987 film
 Wall Street (Wig Wam album) or the title song, 2012

In sports:
 Wallstreet, the world's first-ever  graded rock climb by Wolfgang Gullich.

See also
Wall Street Historic District (Manhattan)
Wall Street Historic District (Norwalk, Connecticut)
 The Wall Street Journal, a daily newspaper
 Occupy Wall Street
r/wallstreetbets
 Wolf of Wall Street (disambiguation)